The Orange County Fire Rescue Department provides fire protection and emergency medical services to Orange County, Florida. Orange County Fire Rescue Communications services and coordinates 911 calls for Ocoee Fire Department, Winter Garden Fire Rescue Department and Maitland Fire Rescue Department.

Prior to 1981, there were 14 fire control districts serving Orange County and each district had a fire board with elected Fire Commissioners overseeing Fire Operations. In 1981 the decision was made to abolish these individual districts and consolidate all services under one Fire Department to serve unincorporated Orange County under the authority of the Board of County Commissioners.

Stations & apparatus

References

Fire Department
Fire departments in Florida